The Yellow Rose is a 1983 Romanian action film directed by Doru Năstase. This is the second film in the Margelatu series, after Drumul oaselor (1980), followed by Misterele Bucureștilor (1983), Masca de argint (1985), Colierul de turcoaze (1986) and Totul se plătește (1987).

Cast 
 George Motoi - Lt. Delvos
 Ion Dichiseanu - Cpt. Margarit
  - Maritica Ghica
 Traian Stanescu - Aga Villara
 Marga Barbu - Agata Slatineanu
  - Tala'at
 Papil Panduru - 
  - Lt. Corlatescu
  - Buza de Iepure 
 Florin Piersic - Margelatu
 Mihai Mereuta - Oseaca
  - 
 Constantin Codrescu - Rosetti

References

External links 

1983 action films
1983 films
Romanian action films
1980s Romanian-language films